Rahmi Özcan (born 1990) is a Turkish amputee footballer playing as midfielder. He is a member of the Turkey national amputee football team.

Private life 
Rahmi Özcan was born in Manisa in 1990 with a birth defect of right leg deformation, which was amputed above the knee. He uses the crutch at special events only.

Özcan is married and has a daughter.

Sport career 
Özcan attracted the attention of the physical education teacher while he played football in the high school at age of 14. With the support of the 
Turkish Disabled Sports Federation, he started amputee football playing. He was admitted to the Turkey national amputee football team in 2015. He became the captain of the team

Honours 
International
 World Cup
 Winners (1):  2022
 Runners-up (1): 2018

 European Championship
 Winners (2): 2017, 20121

References

1990 births
Living people
Sportspeople from Manisa
Turkish amputee football players
Turkey international amputee football players
Association football midfielders